Homeland Insecurity may refer to:

 Homeland Insecurity (American Dad!), an episode of American Dad!
 Homeland Insecurity (Endwell album), a 2006 album by Endwell
 Homeland Insecurity (Flatland Cavalry album), a 2019 album by Flatland Cavalry